Siapaea is a genus of  plants in the tribe Eupatorieae within the family Asteraceae.

Species
The only known species is Siapaea liesneri, native to the State of Amazonas in southern Venezuela.

References

Endemic flora of Venezuela
Monotypic Asteraceae genera
Eupatorieae